The Real News Network (TRNN) is an independent, nonprofit news organization based in Baltimore, MD that covers both national and international news.

History 

TRNN was founded by documentary producer Paul Jay and Mishuk Munier in September 2003, with the goal of creating a news network that made complicated concepts accessible to the average person. 

TRNN moved to Baltimore in June 2014, with the focus of telling stories about urban America, specifically focusing on the city's issues, including crime, education, and housing that are found throughout the United States. Communications executive John Duda became the organization's executive director in June 2020.

TRNN does not accept funding from advertising, governments, or corporations - it is sustained through donations from viewers and foundations, and has a small for-profit segment.

Content 
TRNN produces five-to-seven minute news reports available online or video on demand. 

In 2016, former Black Panther Marshall "Eddie" Conway became the host and producer of "Rattling the Bars," a weekly investigative program about  prison systems in the US and abroad.

Independent journalist Michael Fox’s podcast “Brazil on Fire” is a joint project of The Real News Network and NACLA.

Staff 

 Editor-in-Chief Maximillian Alvarez was formerly a temporary warehouse worker, an experience which he says impacts whose stories he covers and how.
 Reporters Stephen Janis and Taya Graham were some of the first journalists to cover the story of Anton Black, a 19 year old who died after being pinned to the ground by police in rural Maryland.
 Pulitzer Prize-winning journalist and author Chris Hedges records his weekly digital television show, The Chris Hedges Report, in cooperation with The Real News Network.
 Boston Globe climate reporter Dharna Noor previously led the climate team at TRNN.

See also 

 Alternative media
 Citizen journalism
 Independent media
 Watchdog journalism

References

External links 
 
 

2007 establishments in Ontario
2007 establishments in the United States
Alternative journalism organizations
American news websites
Broadcasting websites
Canadian news websites
Citizen journalism
Internet properties established in 2007
Internet television channels
Investigative journalism
Media analysis organizations and websites
News agencies based in Canada
News agencies based in the United States
Mass media in Baltimore
Mass media in Toronto